Fearful Pleasures is a collection of fantasy and horror short stories by author A. E. Coppard. It was released in 1946 and was the first collection of the author's stories to be published by Arkham House.  It was published in an edition of 4,033 copies.

Contents

Fearful Pleasures contains the following tales:

 "Foreword"
 "Adam and Eve and Pinch Me"
 "Clorinda Walks in Heaven"
 "The Elixir of Youth"
 "Simple Simon"
 "Old Martin"
 "The Bogie Man"
 "Polly Morgan"
 "The Gollan"
 "The Post Office and the Serpent"
 "Crotty"
 "Shinkwin"
 "Ahoy, Sailor Boy!"
 "Gone Away"
 "Rocky and the Bailiff"
 "Ale Celestial"
 "The Fair Young Willowy Tree"
 "Father Raven"
 "The Drum"
 "Cheese"
 "The Homeless One"
 "The Kisstruck Bogie"
 "The Tiger"
 "The Gruesome Pit"

Reception
The New York Times reviewer Helen B. Parker praised Coppard's "great propensity for capturing with lucidity the folk speech of the British Isles", concluding that the collection contained "more than enough poetry of language. His is the rare, musical style that almost demands reading aloud".

References

1946 short story collections
Horror short story collections
Fantasy short story collections
Arkham House books